Junzō, Junzo, Junzoh or Junzou (written: 順三, 純三, 準三, 潤三 or 淳三) is a masculine Japanese given name. Notable people with the name include:

, Japanese field hockey player
, Japanese figure skater
, Japanese communist
, Japanese architect
, Japanese writer
, Japanese politician
, Japanese architect

Japanese masculine given names